is a Japanese footballer currently playing as a midfielder for Wollongong United.

Career statistics

Club
.

Notes

References

External links

1994 births
Living people
Sportspeople from Hokkaido
Association football people from Hokkaido
Sendai University alumni
Japanese footballers
Japanese expatriate footballers
Association football midfielders
J3 League players
Matsumoto Yamaga FC players
Vegalta Sendai players
Azul Claro Numazu players
Japanese expatriate sportspeople in Australia
Expatriate soccer players in Australia
Wollongong United FC players